Antonín Zápotocký (19 December 1884 – 13 November 1957) was a Czech communist politician and statesman who served as the prime minister of Czechoslovakia from 1948 to 1953 and the president of Czechoslovakia from 1953 to 1957.

Biography
He was born in Zákolany, Kingdom of Bohemia, Cisleithania (then in Austria-Hungary, now in the Czech Republic).

He was a delegate of the Left Wing of the ČSSD to the Second Comintern Congress, held in Petersburg, 19 July – 7 August 1920. Together with Bohumír Šmeral, he co-founded the Communist Party of Czechoslovakia (KSČ) when it broke away from the ČSSD in 1921. He was General Secretary of the KSČ from 1922 to 1925. In 1940, he was sent to Sachsenhausen concentration camp. He was released in 1945.

From 18 June to 18 July 1946 he was Chairman of the Constituent National Assembly.

Zápotocký became Prime Minister on 15 June 1948, replacing Klement Gottwald, who became president. On 14 March 1953, shortly after his return from Joseph Stalin's funeral, Gottwald died. As per the Ninth-of-May Constitution, Zápotocký took over most presidential duties until he was elected president in his own right a week later.

Zápotocký favoured a more humane way of governing, but was outflanked by the Stalinist first secretary, Antonín Novotný.

In May 1953, during the monetary reform, which effectively deprived the farmers and better-paid workers of all their savings, sporadic riots against the communist authorities took place. This occasion gave Novotný a chance to seize the upper hand. At a meeting in Moscow, Zápotocký was told to adhere to "collective leadership"—in effect, give up power to Novotný.

Zápotocký stayed in office until his death in Prague in 1957. He was also second Czechoslovakia president to die in office. His body was cremated at Strašnice Crematorium and interred.

Zápotocký penned several novels, two of which were filmed (Red Glow Over Kladno and New Warrior will Rise).

References

External links
 
 Biography
 H. Gordon Skilling, "The Formation of a Communist Party in Czechoslovakia", American Slavic and East European Review, Vol. 14, No. 3 (Oct., 1955), p. 346-358 
 H. Gordon Skilling, "The Comintern and Czechoslovak Communism: 1921-1929", American Slavic and East European Review, Vol. 19, No. 2 (Apr., 1960), p. 234-247 
 

1884 births
1957 deaths
People from Kladno District
People from the Kingdom of Bohemia
Czech Social Democratic Party politicians
Leaders of the Communist Party of Czechoslovakia
Presidents of Czechoslovakia
Prime Ministers of Czechoslovakia
Members of the Chamber of Deputies of Czechoslovakia (1925–1929)
Members of the Chamber of Deputies of Czechoslovakia (1929–1935)
Members of the Chamber of Deputies of Czechoslovakia (1935–1939)
Members of the Interim National Assembly of Czechoslovakia
Members of the Constituent National Assembly of Czechoslovakia
Members of the National Assembly of Czechoslovakia (1948–1954)
Communist Party of Czechoslovakia prime ministers
Sachsenhausen concentration camp survivors